The Secrets of the Red Sea (French: Les secrets de la Mer Rouge) is a 1937 French adventure film directed by Richard Pottier and starring Harry Baur, Gaby Basset and Alexandre Mihalesco. It was based on the 1931 novel of the same title by Henry de Monfreid.

The film's sets were designed by the art director Lucien Aguettand.

Cast
 Harry Baur as Saïd Ali
 Gaby Basset as Anita
 Habib Benglia as Araba
 Auguste Bovério as Kames
 Charles Dechamps as Chouchana
 Édouard Delmont as Soliman
 Slim Driga as Ismaël
 Maximilienne as L'anglaise		
 Alexandre Mihalesco as Nadir
 Georges Paulais as Sheik Issa
 Raymond Segard as Sélim
 Tela Tchaï as Sultana

References

Bibliography 
Christian Gilles. L'avant-guerre, 1937-1939. Harmattan, 2002.
 Jonathan Miran, "Pearling Fortunes: Recovering 'Ali al-Nahari, a Legendary Red Sea Magnate in the Early Twentieth Century," in Pedro Machado, Steve Mullins & Joseph Christensen. Pearls, People, and Power: Pearling and Indian Ocean Worlds. Ohio University Press, 2020.

External links 
 

1937 films
1937 adventure films
French adventure films
1930s French-language films
Films directed by Richard Pottier
1930s French films